Psychologist is a 2021 Chinese television series directed by Malaysian Chinese director Sam Quah (柯汶利) and produced by Yulele Pictures Co., Ltd. The series is produced with a special fund for guiding and supporting television series in 2020 from the National Radio and Television Administration and is a key television series project supported by the Hainan Free Trade Port.

The series is based on Bi Shumin's 2007 novel Female Psychologist. Starring Yang Zi and Jing Boran, the series premiered on Youku on 23 November 2021 and ended its run on 3 January 2022. The remaining part He Dun's Happiness aired from 23 November to 8 December 2022.

Cast

Main
Yang Zi as He Dun
Ren Feier as young He Dun
A psychologist who had a painful childhood. Once worked at a Psychological Assistance Center and later started her own business. Due to Qian Kaiyi's constant persuasion, She decided to be a regular host of the radio show "Night Talks of the Heart". She had a crush on her high school classmate Qian Kaiyi.
Jing Boran as Qian Kaiyi
Zheng Qianli as young Qian Kaiyi
Host of the popular radio show "Time Interview" but was replaced. To get back the show he started "Night Talks of the Heart" and invited He Dun to co-host the show with him. He likes He Dun.
Wang Jia as Ye Jiahui
Yang Yunhan as young Ye Jiahui
He Dun and Tang Lili's neighbour. Qian Kaiyi's love rival. Deliberately approached He Dun for the "F" file.
Jian Renzi as Tang Lili
He dun's best friend. Works in a high position of a company.

Supporting
Ni Ping as Zhao Xiping
He Dun's mother
Huang Jue as Ji Mingcong
He Dun's professor
Ma Su as Anna
Young Zhao Xiping
Yang Tongshu as Fu Tang
Client F. Ye Jiahui's mother
Liu Xiaohai as Ye Jicheng
Ye Jiahui's adoptive father. Also known as Ye Niantang.
Han Haolin as He Jun
He Dun's younger brother

Production
On September 10, 2020, Psychologist announced Yang Zi and Jing Boran as the female and male protagonists. The series held a pre launching ceremony on October 31, 2020. Psychologist was launched on November 1, 2020, at 1st Hainan Satellite Television Industrial Summit. The series finished filming on March 11, 2021. The whole series was filmed in Sanya, Hainan.

Soundtrack

International broadcast

Special
Due to the 40-episode limit on Chinese dramas announced by the National Radio and Television Administration, the series that was supposed to air with 48 episodes became 40 episodes. The remaining 8 episodes was renamed as He Dun's Happiness and premiered on 23 November, 2022 on the series's first anniversary and finished its run on 8 December 2022.

Original novel
Female Psychologist(女心理師)()

References

External links

Chinese television series
Chinese romance television series
2021 Chinese television series debuts
2022 Chinese television series endings
Mandarin-language television shows
Television shows based on Chinese novels
Chinese novels adapted into television series